Het Belgisch Dagblad ('The Belgian Daily') was a Dutch-language daily newspaper published in The Hague, Netherlands, from 1915 to 1918. Het Belgisch Dagblad was the organ of the Flemish Patriotic League, an organization of Flemish residents in the Netherlands who defended the notion of a unitary Belgian state. The newspaper repeatedly declared its loyalty to the government in Le Havre.

History
The first issue was published on 15 September 1915. The last issue of Het Belgisch Dagblad was published on 31 December 1918.

References

1915 establishments in the Netherlands
1918 disestablishments in the Netherlands
Daily newspapers published in the Netherlands
Dutch-language newspapers
Publications established in 1915
Publications disestablished in 1918
Mass media in The Hague
Defunct newspapers published in the Netherlands